The Power and the Glory is a 1940 novel by Graham Greene.

The Power and the Glory may also refer to:

Film and television
The Power and the Glory (1918 film), a film by Lawrence C. Windom
The Power and the Glory (1933 film), a film starring Spencer Tracy
The Power and the Glory (1941 film), an Australian film
The Power and the Glory, a 1961 American TV film
The Power and the Glory (TV series), a 1992 BBC documentary series

Music

Albums
The Power and the Glory (Bad Ends album) (2023)
The Power and the Glory (Cockney Rejects album) (1981)
The Power and the Glory (Gentle Giant album) (1974)
Power & the Glory, a 1983 album by Saxon
The Power and the Glory, a 1983 album by Jimmy Cliff

Songs
"Power and the Glory", a 1974 song by Phil Ochs
"The Power and the Glory", a song by Horslips from The Book of Invasions
"The Power & the Glory", a 2011 song by White Lies from Ritual

Other uses
Power and Glory, a professional wrestling tag team
"The power and the glory", a phrase from the doxology at the end of the Lord's Prayer
The Power and the Glory, a 1956 play by Denis Cannan
Power and Glory, a 1994 comic book miniseries by Howard Chaykin